Gokak  is a taluka headquarters in the Belgaum district of Karnataka state, India. It is located around 70 km from Belgaum at the confluence of two rivers, the Ghataprabha and the Markandeya. The population of the city is according to 2011 census is approximately 213000. Gokak city has second highest GDP in the district of Belgaum after Belgaum city. The common language is Kannada.

Gokak is surrounded on one side by a range of hills, and on the other side by a vast plain of black soil. The river Ghataprabha flows from the north side of the city and cascades down through a cleft of 167 ft, to form Gokak Falls before flowing through the city. Since the colonial era, the a hydroelectric station under the waterfall has been used to power Gokak Mills, one of the largest manufacturers and exporters of yarn in India. The river Markandeya, a tributary of the Ghataprabha, dashes down through 43 ft step wise hill plates to form Godachinamalaki Falls.

History

Gokak is a place of philosophical and historical significance. According to Hindu Purans, Gokak was a part of Kuntala Country; it was the land of hunting tribes. During historical period many emperors had ruled the Gokak areas: Shatavahanas ruled it during 327 BC to 229 CE, the Western Chalukyas ruled it during 550 CE to610 CE, then it was also ruled by Rashtrakutas and Kalyana Chalukyas; the subordinate-kings of Rashtrakutas called Rattas too ruled Gokak Province during 850 CE to1250 CE under Rashtrakutas as well Kalyana Chalukyas, during their reign, temples and Basadies were built at Konnur, Gokak-Falls, Gokak and Mamadapur. Devagiri Yadavas captured this areas after defeating Rattas but the Sultanas of Delhi took this areas under their control by defeating Yadavas. Then, it was controlled by many emperors namely Kampili Raya, Vijayanagara, Bidar's Bahamani kings, Bijapur Sultans, Mughals (Aurangazeb), Hyderali, Tippu Sultan (Savanoor Nawaab), Maratha Ghorpade and Peshwas; in 1818 CE British captured Gokak by defeating Peshwas. Gokak city became Municipality in 1853 CE, it is second oldest Municipality in Karnataka State. The monuments build during Hindu, Jain and Muslim rules are still found at Gokak and its surroundings. There was a dispute and a battle as well in between Rani Abbakka and Gokak Kotwals who ruled the city in the 16th century. A fort which is in ruins can still be seen at the western side of the city. The Mallikarjun temple, also known affectionately as the "Malikjaan dargha", stands atop a hill, also called the Mallikarjun hill. The tomb of the [(Raja)] of Kittur Mallasarja is at the nearby Duradundeshwar temple in Arabhavi Math. During the British rule in India, the Forbes Gokak Spinning Mill (now owned by Gokak Textiles Limited of the Shapoorji Pallonji Group) was set up in 1887 in Gokak Falls which is located about 6 km north-west of Gokak. It was modernised over decades and is functional till date being a major source of economy for the city. A hydroelectric power plant was also set up in Gokak Falls in 1887, is one of the oldest projects of a kind in the region. The first Hydroelectricity was generated here in Gokak Falls in whole Asia continent.

Gokak taluka contributed to the Prime Minister's Relief Fund which was meant for humanitarian assistance for the Indian Ocean tsunami victims. Child Development Project Officer Mr P N Patil who addressed a press conference had disclosed that it was decided to donate a day's salary of government officials towards the relief fund. The employees of Forbes-Gokak textile industry also contributed about INR  7 lakh ( 700,000). Gokak is also known for its old Hindu Temples. The most famous once are Mahalingeshwara temple, Savalagi Shivalinga Matha, Kadasiddeshwar Matha Konnur-Maradimath, Yogikolla temple and Duradundeshwara temple in Arabhavi. Mahalingeshwara temple is well-known and is located on the Ghataprabha Riverside near Gokak water-falls.  The temple is a large and sprawling structure built in the later Chalukyan style of architecture. The temple has a garbhagriha, (sanctum), an ardhamantapa and a spacious but open mukhamantapa (frontal courtyard). The sanctum with its tall Shikara adorned with exquisite sculptures is a sight to behold. It faces north, an unusual orientation for Shiva temples. On the sides of the Ghataprabha River there are several temples apart from Mahalingeshwara temple that date back to the period of the later Chalukyas of Kalyana who ruled portions of the Deccan from the 10th to the 12th centuries.

The city is growing rapidly in terms of industries, business, as well as the fields of education, arts, literature and folk-art. It is associated with famous Kannada writers and thinkers such as Shri Krishna Murty Puranik, Anand Kanda, Prof K. Sharanappa, Dr. S. B. Totad, Dr. Arjun Y. Pangannavar https://www.educreation.in/author/arjunypangannavar/Basavaraj Kattimani, Prof. Kundanagar Rngler, D.C. Pawate and Raghavendra Patil. Many popular folk-artists such as Padmashri Dr.Chandrashekar Kambar, Ningayya Swami Pujari, Ishwarappa Minachi, Yallappa Pujeri, Dr. Hatapaki and Ishwarachandra Betageri are also associated with the town. Gokak has a world famous waterfall known as Gokak Falls.Dr. Arjun Y. Pangannavar has authored 35+ books on economics and literature,his latest contribution is"Shrimad Valmiki Ramayan Mahakaavya-Darshanm:  Literature- Epic Poem (Kannada),2021.

Etymology
Gokak was basically an 'Agrahar' founded in pre-historic period, place of tribal people/jungle people then ruled by Rattas (850 Ad-1250Ad), Bijapur Sultans, Tippu-Sultan and British (1819) and became Municipality in 1853, next to Belgaum City. It derives its name from Goki trees that grow abundantly in the region as well as it was the place of 'Cow Grazers. Gokak does not have an anglicised name. Gokak is also the last name for many people, most notably the famous scholar V. K. Gokak. The city is also known for "Gokak Kotwals" who ruled the town in the 16th century and had disputes and fought a battle as well with Rani Abbakka at the time.

Dispute regarding district status

Bifurcation of Belgaum district, which includes a total of 16 talukas, has been a longstanding issue. Being the second largest city in Belgaum district, Gokak has been a strong contender for a separate administrative district. Most of these protests in Gokak have been peaceful, however sometimes these protests have turned out to be violent leading to the damage of public property. The protests are held in neighbouring towns surrounding Gokak also.

In October 2008, Bandh was declared in Gokak to demand the District status. All the educational institutions, business establishments, Movie theatres and other trading centres remained closed. The North West Karnataka Road Transport Corporation (NWKRTC) had suspended its transportation services throughout the day but resumed them in the evening.

The P. C Gaddigoudar committee, set up by the state government, recommended formation of Gokak district which would include the talukas of Gokak, Hukkeri, Raybag, Chikkodi and Athani with its sub-divisions at Gokak and Chikkodi, respectively. As of early 2012 no decision has been made regarding bifurcation.

Geography

Gokak is second biggest city after Belgaum city in Belgaum district and is surrounded by the Western Ghats. The Ghataprabha River, which has water almost throughout the year, is the chief source of agricultural and drinking water for local people living in the surrounding villages. It has an average elevation of 553 metres (1814 feet). The city is situated in the central part of Belgaum district which is located in northwestern parts of Karnataka and lies at the border of two states, Maharashtra in the north and Goa on the west. It is located at a distance of 540 km from Bangalore which is the capital city of the state of Karnataka. Gokak comes under Tropical deciduous moist belt in south central India. Majority of the soil in Gokak taluka is composed of laterite soil and small amounts of black soil is found as well.

Vegetation of Gokak can be classified into dry deciduous forests which is generally found scattered in the central and eastern parts of Belgaum district. Domestic animals which are directly dependent on plants can be found in the region. They are used for agricultural as well as transportation purposes in rural areas. Ground water resources are also extensively tapped in remote areas which are not easily accessible to canals and rivers. It has also been found that about 40% of area in Belgaum district has a higher concentration of nitrates in drinking water due to extensive dependency on fertilisers for agriculture. According to a geological survey, ground water in Gokak has a pH of about 8.6 with desirable limits being 6.5 to 8.5. The region around Gokak contains large quantities of gneisses rock which ultimately gives rise to clay deposits. Region lying to the north of Gokak consist of sandstones and quartzite that form low ridges. The manganese deposits occur in Belgaum district between Londa and Gokak taluka. Building stones and moulding sand are available around Khanapur & Gokak in Belgaum district.

Climate
Being situated in central region of Belgaum district which lies in the rugged terrain of north-western Karnataka, Gokak is well known for its pleasant warm climate throughout the year except for the winter. Gokak receives rainfall from both the northeast and the southwest monsoons and the wettest months are June–September. It has the Tropical savannah with dry winter climatic conditions. December & January are generally cold as compared to the rest of year. The coldest month is January with an average low temperature of 15.2 °C and the hottest month is April with an average high temperature of 35.7 °C. Winter temperatures rarely drop below 14 °C (54 °F), and summer temperatures seldom exceed 34–35 °C.

Demographics

 India census, Gokak had a population of 135,166. Males constitute 51% of the population and females 49%. Gokak has an average literacy rate of 67%, higher than the national average of 59.5%: male literacy is 74%, and female literacy is 60%. In Gokak, 13% of the population is under 6 years of age. Kannada is the common language in the region, however other languages like Urdu, Marathi are spoken by a small population. According to the 2011 census Gokak had a SC and ST population of about 7216 and Below Poverty Line population of about 12203. Total population living in slums was about 7496. The literacy rate in men and women as of 2011 was about 76% and 68% respectively which is a little above national average.

Majority of the population in Gokak follows Hinduism. The religions represented in Belgaum district include Hindus (84.59%), Muslims (10.4%), Jains (4.1%), Christians (0.42%) along with Sikhs, Buddhists and others making up the rest of the population.

Economy
Gokak has a predominant agricultural economy in the rural areas where majority of the people are farmers or affiliated to other Agriculture related business. However the population living in the city is benefited from a number of Industries such as Manufacturing, Engineering, Health care, Agricultural, Automotive, Service industry, Insurance and most recently IT/BPO as well. The region around Gokak and parts of central Belgaum district has a good production yield for Sugarcane, Corn, Cotton, Jowar and Betel leaf owing to which there is an industrial presence of a cotton spinning mill, sugar industry and starch processing plant.

KIADB and KSSIDC
Gokak is the only area apart from Belgaum in Belgaum district to have a KIADB industrial area (Karnataka Industrial Areas Development Board) and KSSIDC industrial estate (Karnataka State Small Industries Development Corporation). Karnataka Industrial Areas Development Board (KIADB) is a wholly owned infrastructure agency of Government of Karnataka. Some of its aims are to promote rapid industrialisation with "No profit-No loss" policy. It facilitates various infrastructure projects and acquires land to implement various industrialisation schemes approved by the government of Karnataka. Industries present in KIADB are facilitated with well planned wide asphalted roads, potable water supply & power supply lines and office complexes with accommodation of shops and small business. Some of the industries present in KIADB Gokak are related to food processing, edible oil processing, small-scale cotton spinning mills, toys industry and Agarbatthi industry. KSSIDC on the other hand is responsible for the growth and development of small-scale industries. The agency also provides ISI testing units to help small-scale industry units to process quality products. KSSIDC has well distributed network of raw-material depots across the state which facilitates easy distribution of raw materials for small scale industries.

Textiles industry
Forbes Gokak Ltd. is a major textile industry located about 6 km west of Gokak in the town of Gokak Falls. It is also known as "Gokak Mills". Gokak mills is known for their yarn which is supplied worldwide. Gokak mills have also received ISO 9002 certification.

A unique forestation project known as "Global cooling" was initiated by Gokak Mills on rocky terrain areas surrounding Gokak Falls which led to the planting of 2 million trees. This helped the surrounding area geologically with regard to temperature, rainfall and a better quality of air. This project has won many accolades in the past for the company over and has also received an award in 1994 for its afforestation efforts.

Starch processing
Riddhi Siddhi Gluco Biols Ltd. (RSGBL) is a major starch processing facility located 3 km west of Gokak. It is one of the largest starch processing industries in India. It is headquartered in Ahmedabad, Gujarat with its manufacturing facilities in Gokak Karnataka, Pantnagar in Uttarakhand and Viramgam in Gujarat. The industry has an ISO 9001 certification and is listed on BSE as well. Riddhi Siddhi has acquired two multi-national corn processing units of Glaxo and Hindustan Unilever in the last 15 years.

Cuisine

Being close to the border with the state of Maharashtra and Goa, the cuisine in Gokak is influenced by multiple cultures. Delicacies ranging from the chats like Bhelpuri, Sevpuri, Dhokla to the south Indian dishes like Dosa, Idli, Vada (food), Avalakki, Puri Saagu can be found. There are a number of restaurants serving Indian Chinese cuisine like chow mein, Manchow soup, Gobi manchurian, Szechwan noodles & Spring roll. Located in northern part of Karnataka, a typical menu of many households would contain Bhakri, Chapathi, Eggplant curry, Kosambari or raita, sambhar or Saaru, Papad or Happala, Yogurt, Onions, Chilli, Rice, Jolada rotti, Akki rotti, Ragi rotti, Pakora.

Gokak is also known for its sweets namely Karadantu, Ladgi ladu, Peda and Kunda. Karadantu consists of a number of dry fruits like Almonds, Pistachios, Walnuts, Raisins, grated Coconut flakes, Jaggery, Cashewnut, Apricot and Anjeer. Being very nutritious and healthy it supplies a number of nutrients to the people of all ages. There are a number of restaurants in Gokak which serve these speciality sweets. In the recent years it has been exported in small quantities to countries in Europe and North America. Apart from Karadantu, Gokak is also known for its , a ball-shaped popular sweet in India. It is made using Gram flour, Bombay rava, Dry fruits and ground coconut. These are combined with sugar along with other flavourings, cooked in ghee and moulded into a ball shape. Sometimes Ladgi Ladu are prepared using edible resin as well.

Transportation
Majority of public transport in Gokak connecting surrounding villages and towns is through city buses run by NWKRTC from Gokak bus depot. Auto rickshaws are commonly available at a nominal fare for commuting inside the city.

Road
Gokak is connected by road via State Highway 31 (Jath to Jamboti) and to National Highway 4 (exit at Hattargi cross). NWKRTC which is a sub-division of KSRTC runs buses from Gokak to all corners of Karnataka as well as neighbouring states. There are many prominent private bus services which operate across all major destinations in Karnataka, Goa and Maharashtra. The other state highways passing through Gokak are State Highway 44 (Sankeshwar to Sangam), State Highway 45 (Arabhavi to Challakere), State Highway 103 (Gokak to Saundatti), State Highway 134 (Badami to NH 4 at Hattargi Cross).

Rail
Gokak Road (Konnur) and Ghataprabha are the two main railway stations near Gokak located at a distance of about 12 km and 14 km respectively. These stations fall under Indian Railways grid and are a part of south western division. Miraj junction, which comes under Central Railway Zone is the closest railway junctions to Gokak Road station. They are well connected to major cities like Bangalore, Mysore, Mangalore, Pune, Mumbai, Hyderabad, Goa, New Delhi and Chennai.

Air
The closest Airport to Gokak is Belgaum Airport which is the Oldest Airport in North Karnataka located about 60 km southeast in the town of Sambra . It is the only airport in North Karnataka with an Airforce base. Belagavi is directly connected with Mumbai and Bangalore. The airport is located at 10 km from Belgaum on SH 20 (Belgaum–Bagalkot Road). Hubli and Kolhapur are other domestic airports with 125 and 90 km respectively.
Goa-Dabolim International airport is the nearest international airport.

Belgaum Airport currently has Spicejet flight services to Bangalore, Mumbai, 
Other destinations like Chennai, Hyderabad, New Delhi, Chandigarh, Ahmedabad are also scheduled in recent days.
Air India has a daily service to Pune.

Gallery

Gokak toys
Gokak was once famous for its wooden and paper toys. Artificial fruits, vegetables, animals, birds and more are made up of wood and are popularly known as Gokak toys. These toys are predominantly used as display items at homes and are rarely used by the children as toys. The Karnataka Government is mulling of applying for Geographical indication tag for Gokak toys.

Books
A book named The Life and Living in the Rural Karnatak: (with Reference to Gokak Taluka) by Madhukar Narasinha Desai gives an account of rural conditions with respect to Gokak taluka in the Bombay Karnataka.

Neighboring locations
 Ajjanakatti, Gokak
Konnur

References

External links

 Official website of the City of Gokak
 Maps for administrative divisions of Belagavi district
 

Cities and towns in Belagavi district
Forts in Karnataka